3 VIP האח הגדול (HaAh HaGadol VIP 3 ; lit. The Big Brother VIP 3) is the third VIP season of the Israeli version of the Big Brother series, and the first VIP season aired on Reshet 13. The show premiered on January 12, 2019 and concluded 50 days later on March 2.

This season hosted by Liron Weizman and Guy Zu-Aretz. The winner of the season is Asaf Goren.

Housemates

Nominations table

Notes

: Ben and Shai were automatically nominated for eviction for refused to nominate.
: Shai won the 'rescue game', he is no longer nominated. He nominated Eden and Nataly for eviction.

Nominations totals received

Big Brother House and Sewage 
For the first time, the housemates will be split into two groups on the opening night, as part of the first task. One group will live in the Big Brother House, and the other group will live in the Sewage under the Big Brother House. On Day 3, the task ended. All Sewage housemates were moved to the Big Brother House.

Summary

 On Day 1, during the opening event, Adi Leon is the first housemate to enter the Big Brother House. After he entered the house, he was immediately called to the Diary Room. Adi received a secret task from Big Brother, he had the power to divide the incoming housemates to live in the Big Brother House or in Sewage. At the end of the show, Adi must make a decision. If he enters the Sewage, he will gain immunity. If he enters the Big Brother House, he won't receive an immunity. He chose to enter the Big Brother House officially.
 On Day 2, Aviva and Adi exchanged their place, because Aviva found it difficult to live in Sewage, Adi volunteered to exchange his place in the Big Brother House with Aviva.
 On Day 3, the Big Brother asked Adi to replace one or more housemate of the Sewage with one or more housemate from the Big Brother House. He replaced himself and Ori from the Sewage with Nataly and Hisham from Big Brother House. Later, the task is over, all Sewage housemates were moved to the Big Brother House.

References

External links 
Official website 

VIP 03
Israel 03
2019 Israeli television seasons